Killay railway station served the suburb of Killay, in the historical county of Glamorganshire, Wales, from 1867 to 1964 on the Llanelly Railway.

History 
The station was opened on 14 December 1867 by the Llanelly Railway. It closed on 15 June 1964. The line it served has since been converted to a cycling and pedestrian trail.

A public house called The Railway Inn served passengers and locals, and has continued operation despite the closure of the line.

References 

Disused railway stations in Swansea
Railway stations in Great Britain opened in 1867
Railway stations in Great Britain closed in 1964
1867 establishments in Wales
1964 disestablishments in Wales